Lidzhe is a rural locality (a selo) in Araksky Selsoviet, Tabasaransky District, Republic of Dagestan, Russia. The population was 247 as of 2010. There are 3 streets.

Geography 
Lidzhe is located 11 km northeast of Khuchni (the district's administrative centre) by road. Khapil is the nearest rural locality.

References 

Rural localities in Tabasaransky District